The following are the national records in athletics in Azerbaijan maintained by the Azerbaijan Athletics Federation (AAF).

Outdoor

Key to tables:

ht = hand timing

# = not ratified by federation

Men

Women

Indoor

Men

Women

Notes

References
General
Azerbaijani records 19 May 2022 updated
Specific

External links
AAF web site

Azerbaijan
Athletics
Records
Athletics